Valea Muierii River may refer to

Valea Muierii, a tributary of the Dâmbovicioara in Argeș County, Romania
Valea Muierii, a tributary of the Săliște in Sibiu County, Romania